Croatian God Mars, is a collection of short stories, mostly anti-war and social topics by Miroslav Krleža, considered by many as the greatest Croatian writer of the 20th century. A short story collection that depicted the exploitation of peasants and the miserable condition of the Croatian soldier. Hrvatski bog Mars proved to be his most notable short story collection.

It was first released in year 1922, then again in 1933, and in its final form in 1947.

Stories
 Bitka kod Bistrice Lesne (Battle of Bistrica Lesina)
 Királyi Magyar Honvéd novella 
 Tri domobrana (Three Homedefenders)
 Baraka pet Be (Barrack Five B)
 Domobran Jambrek (Homedefender Jambrek)
 Smrt Franje Kadavera (Death of Franjo Kadaver)
 Hrvatska rapsodija (Croatian Rhapsody)

English translations of the first, fourth, and fifth story are available in Harbors Rich in Ships: Selected Revolutionary Writings. Translated by Željko Cipriš. New York: Monthly Review Press, 2017.

References

Works by Miroslav Krleža
Short stories by Miroslav Krleža
World War I fiction